This is a listing of the horses that finished in either first, second, or third place and the number of starters in the Miracle Wood Stakes, an American stakes race for three-year-olds at one mile on dirt held at Laurel Park Racecourse in Laurel, Maryland.  (List 1995–present)

See also 

 Miracle Wood Stakes
 Pimlico Race Course

References

External links
 Laurel Park website

Laurel Park Racecourse